Law Tsz Chun (born 2 March 1997, in Hong Kong) is a Hong Kong professional football player who currently plays for the Hong Kong Premier League club Kitchee.

Club career
Law joined the Kitchee academy in May 2008 and trained there until July 2015 when was signed to a professional contract. He made his debut 28 October 2015 in a Sapling Cup match against Yuen Long.

In July 2017, Law joined Dreams FC on loan in search of more first team football. In December, he was named on the 40 man preliminary squad for the 2018 Guangdong–Hong Kong Cup but did not make the final squad.

On 24 July 2019, representing Kitchee, Law scored his first career goal against the Premier League champions Manchester City during a club friendly match at the Hong Kong Stadium.

International career
On 10 September 2019, Law made his senior international debut for Hong Kong in the World Cup qualifiers against Iran.

Career statistics

International

International goals

Honours

Club
Kitchee
 Hong Kong Premier League: 2016–17, 2019–20
 Hong Kong Senior Shield: 2016-17, 2018–19 
 Hong Kong FA Cup: 2016–17, 2018–19
 Hong Kong League Cup: 2015–16
 Hong Kong Sapling Cup: 2019–20

References

External links
Law Tsz Chun  at HKFA

Living people
1997 births
Hong Kong footballers
Hong Kong international footballers
Hong Kong Premier League players
Kitchee SC players
Dreams Sports Club players
Association football defenders
Association football midfielders